Robomart is an American technology company and store-hailing platform headquartered in Santa Monica, California. The company has deployed automated stores on wheels that can be hailed to a customer's home. Instead of delivering products the company delivers the entire store which cuts out order and pickup times giving it advantages over delivery.

The Robomart app shows different robomart types, allows users to view products and pricing, and then order a store to their location. After customers have taken goods from the robomart, their order is automatically calculated, their card on file is charged and they are sent a receipt.

History 

Robomart was founded in 2017 by Ali Ahmed, Tigran Shahverdyan, and Emad Suhail Rahim. The company debuted at CES 2018 where it unveiled its concept of a self-driving store.

At GITEX 2018 the company presented its first functional prototype of a fully driverless Robomart. At the 2019 Consumer Electronics Show the company demonstrated the technology behind its autonomous stores and checkout-free shopping experience.

In January 2019, Robomart announced its first partnership with U.S. grocery chain Stop & Shop to test its driverless stores.

In December 2020, Robomart deployed the Pharmacy Robomart in a trial in West Hollywood.

In June 2021, the company launched its commercial service with a fleet of Pharmacy and Snacks Robomarts operating within West Hollywood and Central Hollywood. 

In December 2021, Business Insider named Robomart’s Head of Operations Peter Killackey as a power player of rapid delivery.

Partnerships 
In September 2019, Robomart partnered with Avery Dennison to source the RFID tags used to enable its checkout-free shopping experience. In December 2020, Robomart partnered with Zeeba Vans to provide vehicles for its growing fleet. In June 2021, Robomart partnered with REEF Technology to provide inventory management and restocking services. In addition, REEF's Light Speed grocery division serves as the first merchant selling products through Robomart.

Products 
The company currently operates two store types. The pharmacy Robomart sells health and personal care items such as shampoo, hand sanitizer and ibuprofen, and the snacks Robomart features chocolates, chips, soft drinks and other snack items.

References

External links 
 

Emerging technologies
Robotics
Retail processes and techniques
Internet properties established in 2017
Retail companies established in 2017
Companies based in Los Angeles
2017 establishments in California